Péter Molnár (born 14 December 1983, in Komárno) is an ethnic Hungarian football player from Slovakia who currently plays for BFC Siófok.

Club statistics

Updated to games played as of 9 December 2017.

References

External links
Profile

1983 births
Living people
Sportspeople from Komárno
Hungarians in Slovakia
Slovak footballers
Hungarian footballers
Association football goalkeepers
KFC Komárno players
Győri ETO FC players
BFC Siófok players
Paksi FC players
Nemzeti Bajnokság I players
Puskás Akadémia FC II players
Nemzeti Bajnokság III players
Slovak expatriate footballers
Expatriate footballers in Hungary
Slovak expatriate sportspeople in Hungary